Diese Stadt is Mondscheiner's second album.

Background information
After their album La belle captive and their Extended Play Die Kunst der Verführung, which were not so successful, Mondscheiner signed a contract with Sony BMG, they recorded a new album and their first single. It took six months to get into the Austrian Top 40 charts.

Tracks
Das was wir sind
Heitere Gelassenheit
Dieser Tag
Anwendung der Aufrichtigkeit
Durcheinander
Was ich sehe
Tanzen
Romeo und Julia
Penelope
Schön ist die Welt
Ich kann nicht reden
Ende der Zeit
Bonus:
 Mittendrin

References 

2006 albums